The Philippine Senate Committee on Energy is a standing committee of the Senate of the Philippines.

Jurisdiction 
According to the Rules of the Senate, the committee handles all matters relating to:

 The Department of Energy
 Exploration, exploitation, development, extraction, importation, refining, transport, marketing, distribution, conservation, or storage of all forms of energy products and resources such as from fossil fuels like petroleum, coal, natural gas and gas liquids, and nuclear fuel resources
 Geothermal resources and non-conventional, existing and potential forms of energy resources
 Generation, transmission and distribution of electric power
 The National Power Corporation
 The National Transmission Corporation
 The National Grid Corporation of the Philippines

Members, 18th Congress 
Based on the Rules of the Senate, the Senate Committee on Energy has 15 members.

The President Pro Tempore, the Majority Floor Leader, and the Minority Floor Leader are ex officio members.

Here are the members of the committee in the 18th Congress as of September 24, 2020:

Committee secretary: Grace Ann C. Salesa

See also 

 List of Philippine Senate committees

References 

Energy
Energy in the Philippines